The Department of Workplace Relations and Small Business was an Australian government department that existed between July 1997 and October 1998.

Scope
Information about the department's functions and/or government funding allocation could be found in the Administrative Arrangements Orders, the annual Portfolio Budget Statements and in the Department's annual reports.

At its creation, the Department was responsible for the following:
Industrial relations, including conciliation and arbitration in relation to industrial disputes;
Promotion of sound industrial relations policies, practices and machinery;
Public Service pay and conditions;
Remuneration Tribunals;
Occupational health, safety, rehabilitation and compensation;
Affirmative action;
Equal employment opportunity;
Tradespersons' rights regulations; and
Small business.

Structure
The Department was an Australian Public Service department, staffed by officials who were responsible to the Minister for Workplace Relations and Small Business, Peter Reith.

References

Australia, Workplace Relations and Small Business
Workplace Relations and Small Business